Daniel Francis (born October 1978 in Scarborough, Tobago) is a former professional American and Canadian football defensive back. He was signed by the Washington Redskins as an undrafted free agent in 2007. He played college football for the LSU Tigers.

External links
Just Sports Stats
Hamilton Tiger-Cats bio

1984 births
Living people
American players of Canadian football
Canadian football defensive backs
American football defensive backs
Hamilton Tiger-Cats players
LSU Tigers football players
Sportspeople from Lafayette, Louisiana
Saskatchewan Roughriders players
Washington Redskins players